Deria Nur Haliza (born 8 June 1997) is an Indonesian tennis player. Nur Haliza has a career high WTA singles ranking of 892 achieved on 5 January 2015. Playing for Indonesia in Fed Cup, Nur Haliza has a W/L ratio of 0–1.

External links

1997 births
Living people
Indonesian female tennis players
Sportspeople from Central Java
People from Grobogan Regency
Tennis players at the 2018 Asian Games
Asian Games competitors for Indonesia
21st-century Indonesian women